Autodesk Simulation is a general-purpose multiphysics finite element analysis software package initially developed by ALGOR Incorporated and acquired by Autodesk in January 2009.

It is intended for use with Microsoft Windows and Linux operating systems. It is distributed in a number of different core packages to cater to specific applications, such as mechanical event simulation and computational fluid dynamics.

Under the ALGOR name, the software was used by scientists and engineers worldwide. It has found application in aerospace, and it has received favorable reviews.

Typical uses 
Typical uses include bending, mechanical contact, thermal (conduction, convection, radiation), fluid dynamics, and coupled or uncoupled multiphysics.

Materials and elements database 
Autodesk Simulation's library of material models includes metals and alloys, plastics, glass, foams, fabrics, elastomers, Concrete (with rebar), soils and user-defined materials.

Autodesk Simulation's element library depends on the geometry and the type of analysis performed. It includes 8 and 4 node solid, 8 and 4 node shell, as well as beam and rod elements.

References

External links 
 Autodesk simulation products page

Finite element software
Science software for Linux
Finite element software for Linux